The 5-year-old European Championship, also called European 5-year-old Championship, is an annual Group One harness event that is arranged by the European Trotting Union, UET. The race takes place on a racetrack in one of the member countries of UET. The contenders are chosen by the different national trotting federations that are members of UET. Only 5-year-old European-born stallions and mares can be selected. The 5-year-old European Championship was raced for the first time in 1967.

The 2009 championship was raced at Treviso Racetrack, Italy, on July 26, and had a purse of approximately US$132,000, or €100,000.

Racing conditions
The distance has most years been between 2,000 and 2,300 meters. There are two exceptions. In 1982 and 1986, the distances were 1,600 and 1,660 meters respectively. The distance interval has decreased and since 1990, the race has been over 2,060-2,150 meters. The race has always been started by the use of auto start.

Past winners

Drivers with most wins
 2: Eddy Freundt (1967, 1970)
 2: Stig H. Johansson (1973, 1988) 
 2: Anders Lindqvist (1990, 1995)
 2: Joseph Verbeeck (1998, 2003)

Sires with at least two winning offsprings
 3: Pay Dirt (Tarok, Granit Bangsbo, Hairos)
 2: Cocktail Jet (Kiwi, Jetstile)
 2: Express Rodney (Express Gaxe, Ex Lee)

Countries, number of wins
 17: 
 10: 
 6: 
 3: 
 3: 
 3: 
 2: 
 1:

Fastest winners
 1:11.3 (km rate): Mara Bourbon (2005)

All winners of the 5-year-old European Championship

References

Harness racing in Europe